Washington Park is a public park in Seattle, Washington, United States, most of which is taken up by the Washington Park Arboretum, a joint project of the University of Washington, the Seattle Parks and Recreation, and the nonprofit Arboretum Foundation.  Washington Park also includes a playfield and the Seattle Japanese Garden in its southwest corner. To the north is Union Bay; to the west are Montlake and Madison Valley; to the south is the Washington Park neighborhood; and to the east is the Broadmoor Golf Club.

Description 
Lake Washington Boulevard E. runs north and south through the park, parallel to the creek. A secondary road, for most of its length named Arboretum Drive E. and for a short northern stretch named E. Foster Island Road, runs along the Arboretum's eastern edge. E. Interlaken Boulevard and Boyer Avenue E. run northwest out of the park to Montlake and beyond. State Route 520 cuts through Foster Island and the Union Bay wetlands at the park's northern end, interchanging with Lake Washington Boulevard just outside the arboretum entrance.  A footpath winds underneath the freeway overpasses and over boardwalks, along the Lake Washington ship canal, and into the gardens of the Arboretum.

The Arboretum is well known for Azalea Way in the springtime, a stretch of the park which offers a unique tapestry of azaleas of many colors.  The area is a popular site for strolling and is utilized by photographers and artists. The manicured Azalea Way stands out in stark contrast with the Arboretum's wild and heavily canopied areas.

The land occupied by the Washington Park Arboretum has been developed  and is owned by the city, but the Arboretum is operated primarily by the University of Washington.

The creek's source is a spring-fed stream in the Alder Creek Natural Area, three publicly owned properties on 26th Ave East between East Helen and Prospect streets. The stream feeds the koi pond in Washington Park's Japanese Garden, near Washington Park Playfield at the park's southern end. It also receives runoff from Rhododendron Glen and the Woodland Garden, as well as sub-surface drainage from the neighboring course of the Broadmoor Golf Club. It empties into Lake Washington via Willow Bay, itself a minor arm of Union Bay, having passed through numerous culverts under Lake Washington Boulevard.

History

Washington Park was developed on land that had been logged by the Puget Mill Company for sixty years. In 1920, the parcel was split in two.  The eastern 200 acres (0.8 km2) were developed as the Broadmoor Golf Club by a group of businessmen that included E. G. Ames, general manager of Puget Mill. The western 230 were given to the city, who developed a park and arboretum on the site. On the basis of the agreement approved by the University of Washington (Board of Regents) and the City of Seattle (City Council/Mayor), The Washington Park Arboretum was established in 1934.

Highway impacts

Ghost ramps 

State Route 520 has a set of ghost ramps in the marshlands the arboretum. They are often referred to as "ramps to nowhere". However, one ramp is currently used for the on ramp to SR 520 Eastbound. The others are unused. They were originally part of a plan to build the R. H. Thomson Expressway which would have cut through the arboretum and down through Seattle towards the I-90/I-5 interchange. Citizens rallied a freeway revolt against the plan on May 4, 1969. Construction near the Arboretum later continued but citizen protest eventually won out and the plan was dropped in 1971.

The freeway revolt that stopped the R. H. Thomson Expressway had its origins in opposition to SR 520 itself. Architect Victor Steinbrueck, writing in 1962, objected to the "naked brutality of unimaginative structures such as this proposed crossing of Portage Bay, which eliminates fifty houseboats while casting its shadow and noise across this tranquil boat haven."

In 2013 the Washington State Department of Transportation announced plans to dismantle the ghost ramps. To commemorate the ramps and protest their demolition, a local art collective created an installation, Gate to Nowhere, on one of the ramps in 2014. The piece consists of a layer of reflective acrylic wrapping a pair of support columns.

In the spring of 2016, some of the SR 520 ghost ramps have begun to be dismantled to make way for the construction of a new causeway linking the new floating bridge to the mainland.

Modern plans 

The potential impact of plans to reconstruct and expand State Route 520 and replace the Evergreen Point Floating Bridge in the early 2010s have raised concerns among Arboretum staff and park users. As the members of the Arboretum community noted in their collective letter to the Washington State Department of Transportation, "Native plants, wetlands, and wildlife ... would be affected not only by the taking of land but by the looming shadows created by roadways in various proposals". Among the alternative proposals is the "Arboretum Bypass Plan," building the new elevated highway over Union Bay on a more northerly route than the current one.

Seattle Japanese Garden 

The Seattle Japanese Garden is a 3.5 acre (14,000 m2) Japanese garden in the Madison Park neighborhood of Seattle, Washington. The Garden is located in the Southern end of the Washington Park Arboretum on Lake Washington Boulevard East. The Garden is one of the oldest Japanese Gardens in North America, and is regarded as one of the most authentic Japanese Gardens in the United States.

See also
 List of botanical gardens in the United States
 North American Plant Collections Consortium

References

External links

Washington Park Arboretum: Center for Urban Horticulture, College of Forest Resources, University of Washington
Japanese Garden
Parks department: Washington Park Playfield
Some photos in and around the arboretum
History of Washington Park (and Arboretum), including several hand-drawn maps, on the site of the Seattle Department of Parks and Recreation.

Arboreta in Washington (state)
Botanical gardens in Washington (state)
Parks in Seattle
Woodland gardens